The Sunday News is a New Zealand tabloid newspaper published each weekend in Auckland. In addition to a self-described 'punchy' take on the news, it features coverage of weekend sport, entertainment, star gossip, fashion and TV listings.

It is owned by media business Stuff Ltd, formerly the New Zealand branch of Australian media company Fairfax Media.

External links
Sunday News

Newspapers published in New Zealand
Mass media in Auckland
Publications established in 1964
1964 establishments in New Zealand